The La Crosse River State Trail is a  rail trail between Sparta and Onalaska, Wisconsin. It is designed for foot, bicycle, equestrian or light motorized traffic. It is designated as a multiuse trail, offering recreational access to the routes, and is open to the public. The trail runs parallel to the La Crosse River.

It is one of four connecting bike trails in west-central Wisconsin that spans approximately one-third of the state.  The trail is known for the rural scenery and terrain of the Coulee Region.  It is part of the larger Wisconsin bike trail system, operated by the state of Wisconsin. 

The four connecting west central Wisconsin trails, known as the Bike 4 Trails, going from southeast to northwest are:

the 400 State Trail
the Elroy-Sparta State Trail
the La Crosse River Trail
the Great River Trail

The trail headquarters is located in a historic depot in Sparta and is open from May 1 through October 31. There is a $5.00 per day fee for use of the trail if one does not have the $25.00 yearly Wisconsin bike trail pass.  Camping, lodging, food, parking, bike rentals and information are available at many points along the trail.

The trail is constructed upon the abandoned Chicago and North Western Railway railroad bed. It originally was built for the Baraboo Air Line Railroad and the  La Crosse, Trempealeau & Presscott Railroad routes from Sparta to Winona, Minnesota. The trail is not paved, but is smooth, and covered with packed crushed limestone.

See also 

List of rail trails
What is a rail trail
List of hiking trails in Wisconsin
List of bike trails in Wisconsin

References

External links
Official website including history and campground information and maps
Discover Onalaska 
DNR page 

Rail trails in Wisconsin
Chicago and North Western Railway